Conta may refer to:

 Conta, a genus of catfish
 Conta (surname)
 Contà, a municipality in Trentino, Italy